Carl G. Hagman (December 24, 1898 – May 22, 1974) was an American tradesman and politician.

Hagland was born in Minneapolis, Minnesota and graduated from South High School in Minneapolis. He also went to University of Minnesota Law School. Hagland lived with his wife in Minneapolis. He was a tile layer and was involved with the Minneapolis Building Trades Council. Hagland served in the Minnesota House of Representatives from 1935 to 1940 and from 1943 to 1960. He died in Minneapolis, Minnesota and the funeral and burial was in Minneapolis, Minnesota.

References

1898 births
1974 deaths
Politicians from Minneapolis
South High School (Minnesota) alumni
Trade unionists from Minnesota
University of Minnesota Law School alumni
Members of the Minnesota House of Representatives